Templeogue College C.S.Sp is a boys' voluntary secondary school in the suburb of Templeogue, Dublin in Ireland.

History and statistics
It was founded in 1966 and is run by the Holy Ghost Fathers, a Roman Catholic religious institute. There were 700 pupils and 50 teachers at the school in 2020.

Sport
The school participates in sports including rugby union, basketball, football, athletics, and badminton. 

The school's rugby team, whose colours are red and blue, has reached the final of the Leinster Schools Junior Cup twice, in 1980 and in 1985. In the 1980 final, the school lost 0-4 to Blackrock College of Dublin and, in the 1985 final, the school lost 0-14 to Presentation College of Bray, County Wicklow. 

In 2002, the school rugby team visited South Africa, the first state school in Ireland to do so. 
 In 2003, the school won the Leinster Schools Rugby Senior League. Also in rugby, the school has won a number of McMullen Shield competitions.

Alumni

 Carl Mullan, Irish radio presenter
 Denis Bastick, Gaelic footballer, Dublin inter-county team
 Lorcan Dempsey, Vice President and Chief Strategist of OCLC
 Diarmuid Gavin, gardener and TV personality
 Brendan Hyland, International Swimmer
 Morgan Kelly (Irish economist), Professor of Economics at UCD
 Dave McSharry, Connacht rugby union player
 Eoghan O'Gara, Gaelic footballer, Dublin inter-county team
 Malcolm O'Kelly, former Irish international rugby union player
 Dara O'Shea, (footballer) footballer with West Bromwich Albion
 Eric O'Sullivan, Ulster rugby union player 
 Mick Pyro, lead singer of the band Republic of Loose
 Rob Rogers, League of Ireland referee
 Rob Smith, musician
 Enda Stevens, (footballer) footballer with Sheffield United

References

External links
 

Boys' schools in the Republic of Ireland
Secondary schools in South Dublin (county)
Catholic secondary schools in the Republic of Ireland
Spiritan schools
Templeogue
1966 establishments in Ireland
Educational institutions established in 1966